India competed at the 2002 Asian Games held in Busan, South Korea. India was ranked 8th with 10 gold medals. Sunita Rani's gold and bronze medals, which she won in the women's 1,500 m and 5,000 m was reinstated after she appealed in the dope scam. India moved up to the seventh spot from the previous eighth spot in the medals table.

Medal table

Medalists

Athletics

Nations at the 2002 Asian Games
2002
Asian Games